Sebastiano is both a masculine Italian given name and a surname. Notable people with the name include:

 Sebastiano Antonio Tanara (1650–1724), Italian cardinal
 Sebastiano Baggio (1913–1993), Italian clergyman
 Sebastiano Bianchi (16th century), Italian engraver
 Sebastiano Bombelli (1635–1724), Italian painter
 Sebastiano Brunetti (died 1649), Italian painter
 Sebastiano Carezo (fl. 1780), Spanish dancer (Sebastián Cerezo)
 Sebastiano Conca (c. 1680 – 1764), Italian painter
 Sebastiano Dolci (1699–1777), Croatian writer
 Sebastiano Esposito (born 2002), Italian footballer
 Sebastiano Filippi (c. 1536 – 1602), Italian late Renaissance-Mannerist painter
 Sebastiano Galeotti (1656–1746), Italian painter
 Sebastiano Ghezzi (1580–1645), Italian painter and architect
 Sebastiano Guala (17th century), Italian church architect
 Sebastiano Martinelli (1848–1918), Cardinal of the Roman Catholic Church
 Sebastiano Mazzoni (c. 1611 – 1678), Italian painter
 Sebastiano Mocenigo (1662–1732), Doge of Venice
 Sebastiano Nela (born 1961), Italian ex-footballer
 Sebastiano del Piombo (c. 1485 – 1547), Italian Renaissance-Mannerist painter
 Sebastiano Ricci (1659–1834), Italian painter
 Sebastiano Rossi (born 1964), Italian footballer
 Sebastiano Santi (1788–1866), Italian painter
 Sebastiano Serafini, Italian actor, model, and musician
 Sebastiano Serlio (c. 1475 – 1554), Italian Mannerist architect
 Sebastiano Siviglia (born 1973), Italian football defender
 Sebastiano Taricco (1645–1710), Italian painter
 Sebastiano Timpanaro (1923–2000), Italian classical philologist, essayist, and literary critic
 Sebastiano Venier (c. 1496 – 1578), Doge of Venice
 Sebastiano Visconti Prasca (1883–1961), Italian military officer
 Sebastiano Ximenes (16th century), Italian banker
 Sebastiano Ziani (12th century), Doge of Venice
 Richiardi Sebastiano (1834–1904), Italian anatomist and zoologist

See also
 San Sebastiano (disambiguation)

Italian-language surnames
Italian masculine given names